Sport José Galvez was a Peruvian football club, located in the city of Lima. The club was founded with the name of club Sport José Galvez and played in Peruvian Primera División from 1915 until 1926. The club won the national tournament in 1915 and 1916. In 1926, Sport José Galvez was relegated and it was their last appearance in the Peruvian Primera División.

Honours

National
Peruvian Primera División: 2
Winners (2): 1915, 1916

See also
List of football clubs in Peru
Peruvian football league system

External links
 La difusión del fútbol en Lima (Spanish)
 RSSSF - Peru - List of Champions
 Peruvian football seasons

Football clubs in Lima
Association football clubs established in 1902